Elections were held in Eastern Visayas for seats in the House of Representatives of the Philippines on May 9, 2016.

Summary

Biliran
Rogelio Espina is the incumbent and running unopposed.

Eastern Samar
Ben Evardone is the incumbent.

Leyte
Each of Leyte's 5 others legislative districts will elect each representative to the House of Representatives. The candidate with the highest number of votes wins the seat.

1st District
Ferdinand Martin G. Romualdez is the incumbent but ineligible for reelection. He is running for senate instead. His party nominates his wife and former beauty queen Yedda Marie Romualdez

2nd District
Sergio Antonio Apostol is the incumbent.

3rd District
Andres D. Salvacion Jr. is the incumbent but ineligible for reelection.

4th District
Lucy Torres-Gomez is the incumbent.

5th District
Jose Carlos Cari is the incumbent.

Northern Samar
Each of Northern Samar's 2 legislative districts will elect each representative to the House of Representatives. The candidate with the highest number of votes wins the seat.

1st District
Harlin Abayon is the incumbent.

2nd District
Emil L. Ong was the incumbent but ineligible for reelection. His party nominated his son, Edwin Ongchuan, running unopposed.

Samar
Each of Samar's 2 legislative districts will elect each representative to the House of Representatives. The candidate with the highest number of votes wins the seat.

1st District
Mel Senen Sarmiento is the incumbent but not seeking for reelection. He was appointed as secretary of DILG on September 11, 2015.

2nd District
Milagrosa Tan is the incumbent

Southern Leyte
Damian Mercado is the incumbent but he is again running for governor. His brother, former Rep. Roger Mercado was nominated by his party.

References

External links
COMELEC - Official website of the Philippine Commission on Elections (COMELEC)
NAMFREL - Official website of National Movement for Free Elections (NAMFREL)
PPCRV - Official website of the Parish Pastoral Council for Responsible Voting (PPCRV)

2016 Philippine general election
Lower house elections in Eastern Visayas